Bill Patten may refer to:

Bill Patten (baseball), played in 1975 for Anderson Rangers
Bill Van Patten, academic

See also
Bill Patton (disambiguation)
William Patten (disambiguation)